John Jones "of Ystrad" (1777–1842), was a Welsh politician, MP for Carmarthen from 1821 to 1832.

He was born on 15 September 1777 in King Street, Carmarthen, the son of a solicitor.  Educated at Eton College and Christ Church, Oxford, he went on to Lincoln's Inn to qualify as a barrister.  His work on the South Wales circuit took him back to his home area, and he stood as a Conservative at the election of 1812.  In 1815, he replaced Sir Thomas Picton as MP for Pembroke Boroughs.  In 1818 he was again defeated at Carmarthen, but eventually won the seat three years later.

Although regarded as a Tory in politics, Jones's main pre-occupation was local politics and after his election to Parliament he concentrated much of his energy upon having a controlling interest in the Carmarthen Town Council.

When Reform legislation was introduced in the House of Commons in 1831, Jones voted against the second reading on 22 March. At the subsequent General Election, he was injured in rioting at the Carmarthen Guildhall. The voting was called off, and the election for the constituency had to be re-run in August, when Jones retained the seat. Later that year he fought a duel with another politician, Robert Fulke Greville.

Despite eventually voting in favour of the Reform Bill, he was defeated in the 1832 general election.  From 1837 to 1841 he was MP for Carmarthenshire.  His efforts to have the salt tax abolished earned him the nickname "Jones yr Halen" ("Jones the Salt").

Jones died on 10 November 1842.


References

Footnotes

Bibliography

External links 

1777 births
1842 deaths
People educated at Eton College
Alumni of Christ Church, Oxford
Members of the Parliament of the United Kingdom for Carmarthenshire constituencies
UK MPs 1820–1826
UK MPs 1826–1830
UK MPs 1830–1831
UK MPs 1831–1832
UK MPs 1837–1841
Conservative Party (UK) MPs for Welsh constituencies
People from Carmarthen
Members of Lincoln's Inn
Tory MPs (pre-1834)